Mickaël Pizzo (born 26 March 1979) is a French former professional footballer who played as a midfielder and current manager of AS Poissy.

Career
Pizzo was born in Saint-Denis.

During his time at Kilmarnock he scored once against St Johnstone.

References

1979 births
Living people
Association football midfielders
French footballers
Ligue 2 players
Red Star F.C. players
French expatriate footballers
Expatriate footballers in Scotland
Scottish Premier League players
Kilmarnock F.C. players
US Sénart-Moissy players
Grenoble Foot 38 players
US Avranches players
AS Poissy players